The Coupe de la Ligue Final 2004 was a football match held at Stade de France, Saint-Denis on April 17, 2004, that saw Sochaux defeat Nantes in a penalty shootout.

Match details

See also

 Coupe de la Ligue 2003–04

External links
 Report on LFP official site

2004
FC Nantes matches
FC Sochaux-Montbéliard matches
Association football penalty shoot-outs
2003–04 in French football
April 2004 sports events in France
Sport in Saint-Denis, Seine-Saint-Denis
Football competitions in Paris
2004 in Paris